Cerbera floribunda, commonly known as cassowary plum, grey milkwood, or rubber tree, is a plant in the family Apocynaceae which is native to the region from Sulawesi to the Solomon Islands, including
north east Queensland.

Description 

The bark is brown to grey/black, and the sap wood and heart wood are both white. Leaves are lanceolate-elliptic, glossy green above and paler beneath, alternate or whorled and crowded towards the ends of the twigs.

Taxonomy 

Cerbera floribunda was first described by Karl Moritz Schumann in Die Flora von Kaiser Wilhelms Land (K.M.Schumann & U.M.Hollrung, Fl. Kais. Wilh. Land: 111 (1889)) in 1889.

Distribution and habitat 

This is a tropical plant and favours abundant water. The native range is from Sulawesi, east through the Maluku Islands and New Guinea to Solomon Islands, and south to Queensland; it is widespread throughout the range and not considered to be endangered. It is generally found along creeks and marshes and always near permanent water.

Ecology 

Fruits are swallowed whole by cassowaries, who are not affected by the toxins contained within. They then excrete the seeds later, helping to distribute them. The cassowary is the only animal able to provide this function, due to the size of the fruits, and this forms a classic example of a symbiotic relationship between the two species.

Rodents, in particular the White-tailed rat, eat the kernels after stripping away the flesh but in this case (if they leave some of the kernel behind) it is unlikely to germinate.

Toxicity 

As with other species of Cerbera, and indeed many other species in the family Apocynaceae, fruits of this plant are toxic to humans. Cerbera species contain the cardiac glycoside cerberin, and if eaten will result in nausea, vomiting, abdominal pain, and potentially death. The white sap, which is produced from all parts of the tree, may also cause skin irritation on contact.

Uses 

The timber has been used for mouldings and interior finishings in Bouganville and other parts of Papua New Guinea, and for carvings and medicine in the Solomon Islands.

Gallery

External links 

See a map of recorded sightings of Cerbera floribunda at the Australasian Virtual Herbarium

References 

floribunda
Trees of Sulawesi
Trees of New Guinea
Trees of the Solomon Islands
Trees of the Maluku Islands
Gentianales of Australia
Flora of Queensland